The Sunshine Coast Falcons are a rugby league football team based on Queensland's Sunshine Coast. They compete in the Queensland Cup and their home ground is Sunshine Coast Stadium. The Falcons are currently affiliated with the NRL team Melbourne Storm.

History
The Falcons were originally the Winfield State League representative team for the Sunshine Coast. First competing in the 1993 season, they won their pool before losing in the semi-finals. For the 1994 season, they competed as Sunshine Coast/Gympie, against winning the pool matches, but losing both semi-final matches. In the last year of the State League, the combined Sunshine Coast/Gympie team failed to progress from the pool stage. They competed in the first season of the Queensland Cup in 1996 but dropped out the following season. 

In 2006, the club joined the FOGS Cup competing in the second-level competition. The club finished their first season in sixth position, just outside the finals positions.

Partnership with Manly (2009-2010) 
In 2009, they were readmitted to the Queensland Cup after securing an agreement with the NRL's Manly Sea Eagles to become a feeder club.  Between 2009 and 2013 the club was renamed the Sunshine Coast Sea Eagles due to the partnership with the Manly Sea Eagles. 

The partnership instantly proved successful with the team winning the 2009 Queensland Cup Grand Final 32-18 to secure their first premiership, with a number of Manly players in the squad. Following the end of the 2010 season, Manly were forced to cut ties with the club after a change in policy disallowed NRL teams from having feeder clubs in both the Queensland Cup and New South Wales Cup.

Partnership with Melbourne Storm (2014-)

In 2014 the club reverted to the Falcons name and struck a three-year partnership with the Melbourne Storm from the 2015 season. The Falcons endured a 36-game losing streak during the 2013 and 2014 seasons, on their way to consecutive wooden spoons.

In May 2021, Melbourne extended their affiliation partnership with the Falcons to the end of the 2024 season.

Life Members

In September 2021, the club awarded the first life memberships of the club:
 Don Oxenham – Inaugural CEO and former board member
 Dave Cordwell – Coach (Colts: 2009-10; FOGs Cup: 2011; Queensland Cup: 2012-13) and former board member
 Alan Marr – Board member 2009-19
 Gordon Oakes – Chairman 2006-13

Season Summaries

Honours

Queensland Cup
 Premierships: 1 (2009)
 Runners Up: 1 (2017)
 Minor Premiership: 1 (2019)
 Duncan Hall Medal: 1 (Tony Williams – 2009)
 Petero Civoniceva Medal: 1 (Daly Cherry-Evans  – 2010)
 Rookie of the Year: 2 (Daly Cherry-Evans  – 2010); (Brandon Smith – 2017)
 Coach of the Year: 1 (Eric Smith – 2019)

Junior
 Hastings Deering Colts: 1 (2019)

Players

2022 squad

Melbourne Storm allocated players

Storm splits its squad of NRL and development list players between the Falcons and Brisbane Tigers, with players not required for that weekend’s NRL fixture heading to their Queensland Cup team:

 Nelson Asofa-Solomona
 Kenny Bromwich
 Sua Fa'alogo
 Harry Grant
 Jack Howarth
 Jahrome Hughes
 Cooper Johns
 Tui Kamikamica
 Chris Lewis
 Trent Loiero
 Tepai Moeroa
 Justin Olam
 Ryan Papenhuyzen
 Brandon Smith
 Reimis Smith
 William Warbrick
 Tyran Wishart

Representatives
The following players have played representative football for the Queensland Residents in the annual match against NSW Residents while playing for the Falcons.

 Trent Hodkinson (2009)
 Daly Cherry-Evans (2010 - captain)
 Jamie Buhrer (2010)
 Ben Hampton (2015)
 Kenny Bromwich (2015)
 Jahrome Hughes (2017)
 Lachlan Timm (2018)
 Tino Fa'asuamaleaui (2019)
 Darryn Schonig (2019)

Awards 

The James Ackerman Medal is awarded to the Sunshine Coast Falcons Player of the Year. The award is named in honour of the late James Ackerman, who died from injuries sustained in a tackle while playing for the Falcons against Norths Devils in 2015.

Personnel

Coaches

 2009 – 2010 — Brandon Costin
 2011 — Adam Mogg
 2012 – 2013 — Dave Cordwell
 2014 — Ivan Henjak (quit midseason, replaced by Glen Dreger)
 2015 — Glen Dreger
 2016 – 2018 — Craig Ingebrigtsen
 2019 — Eric Smith
 2020 – 2021 — Sam Mawhinney
 2022 – present – Brad Henderson

Name, logo and colours
The Falcons historic colours have been black and gold however when the Manly Sea Eagles announced their partnership with the Falcons the club rebranded to become the Sunshine Coast Sea Eagles and the colours changed to Manly's colours of maroon and white. When the feeder arrangement ended the club continued with the name but changed the colours to blue and white. However fans and players on the Sunshine Coast called for a return to the clubs traditional name and colours and in the 2014 season the club complied, rebranding back to the Falcons with gold and black colours.

Stadium 
The Falcons home ground is Sunshine Coast Stadium, located in Kawana Waters.

In both 2020 and 2021, Falcons' affiliated NRL club Melbourne Storm were forced to relocate to the Sunshine Coast Stadium due to the ongoing COVID-19 pandemic in Australia.

Major Sponsors 

 Vantage Homes Queensland
 Sunshine Toyota
 South East Civil
 Bebrok Excavations
 Sunshine Coast Council
 FC Lawyers
 Green RV
 North Coast Foods
 Go Turf
 Southern Cross Sheds
 Maroochy RSL
 Pacific Office Solutions
 Channel 9
 Sea FM
 Sunshine Coast Daily
 Asset Electrical Contractors
 Headland Plumbing & Drainage
 L & H Electrical 
 Subway

See also

National Rugby League reserves affiliations

References

External links
 Website
 Facebook

 
Sport in the Sunshine Coast, Queensland
Rugby league teams in Queensland
Rugby clubs established in 1996